David Drummond Sherlaw was a Scottish professional footballer who played as a forward in the Football League for Charlton Athletic, Brentford and Bristol City. He also played in the Scottish League for Bathgate, Montrose, St Johnstone, St Bernard's and Leith Athletic.

Career 
A forward, Sherlaw began his career at Scottish League Second Division club Bathgate, before moving to England to sign for Third Division South high-flyers Bristol City in May 1925. Six goals and 21 appearances later, he moved to struggling divisional rivals Charlton Athletic in January 1926. Sherlaw again moved within the Third Division South to join Brentford in 1928 and scored 8 goals in 29 appearances during the 1928–29 season. He fell out of first team contention and returned to Scotland to sign for Second Division club St Johnstone in 1932, before finishing his career with Montrose and Leith Athletic.

Personal life 
Sherlaw's great-grandson, Andrew Montgomery, won the Crieff Soccer Centre Player of the Year award in 2008, aged seven.

Career statistics

Honours 
Brentford

 London Charity Fund: 1928

References

1901 births
People from Penicuik
Scottish footballers
Year of death missing
English Football League players
Association football forwards
Brentford F.C. players
Bathgate F.C. players
Bristol City F.C. players
Charlton Athletic F.C. players
St Johnstone F.C. players
Dalkeith Thistle F.C. players
St Bernard's F.C. players
Montrose F.C. players
Scottish Football League players
Leith Athletic F.C. players